"Year 3000" is a song performed by British pop rock band Busted. It was released as the second single from their debut studio album Busted (2002).

"Year 3000" reached number two on the UK Singles Chart and became the 34th-biggest seller of the year with 165,000 units. The single was also a success in the rest of Europe, reaching number two on the Irish Singles Chart while reaching the top 10 in Belgium and the Netherlands. The song has been covered by American pop band Jonas Brothers.

Background
The idea for "Year 3000" came from James Bourne. It was inspired by his obsession with Back to the Future, hence the references to the flux capacitor and the fact that the time machine mentioned is "like the one in a film I've seen". Bourne has also stated that the song was also inspired by Robbie Williams' 1998 hit, "Millennium".

The song is written in the key of B major.

Chart performance
"Year 3000" debuted at number two on the UK Singles Chart, one place higher than previous single "What I Go to School For". It was kept off number one by "Stop Living the Lie" by Fame Academy winner David Sneddon.

Music video
The music video for the song begins with Matt Willis playing a video game called "Stay Alive". When he loses, the video zooms out to view the band playing the song's intro in a bedroom. After Charlie Simpson starts singing, they hear an explosion-like sound outside. They look out of a window to the backyard and find their neighbour Peter, played by James Bourne's brother Chris, standing next to a Vauxhall Viva customised like the DeLorean time machine from Back to the Future. They get in the car and Peter takes them to the future. The song continues as they go through a time vortex, and arrive in the year 3000. They see many changes, such as various aliens, flying cars and the fact that everyone now lives under the ocean. They also see three triple-breasted women, one of whom throws her bra at them and the three boys fight over it.

As the song continues, Busted look at a billboard and see themselves very much older. James and Matt react embarrassed with their future selves, but Charlie nods in appreciation and looks relatively happy with his. At the song's bridge, Busted come across a concert hall with a sign saying "Busted, Live Tonight". They sneak in, lock their older selves inside a green room and jump onto the stage, where the song continues in front of an audience. At the closing of the song, the setting switches back and forth from the concert to the bedroom from the video's intro, and ends with Busted jumping into their logo.

As of January 2022, the song has 15 million views on YouTube.

Track listing

Charts and certifications

Weekly charts

Year-end charts

Certifications

Jonas Brothers cover

In 2006, Busted permitted the Jonas Brothers to make a cover of "Year 3000". Since the Jonas Brothers mainly had a pre-teen fanbase, all the sexually suggestive lyrics were simplified – the line "and your great-great-great granddaughter is pretty fine" is changed to "doin' fine" and "Triple-breasted women swim around town, totally naked" is changed to "girls there, with round hair like Star Wars, float above the floor." Also, the line "Everybody bought our seventh album, it had outsold Michael Jackson" is changed to "it had outsold Kelly Clarkson".

Chart performance
After the song's release in early 2007, the song debuted at #40 on the Billboard Hot 100. "Year 3000" was the group's first single to chart and their first Top 40 hit. The song eventually peaked at #31 and sold 1,050,000 copies in the US. The group's cover was the first single they released under Hollywood Records, and it was the only song Hollywood received distribution rights to after the group was dropped from Columbia. It was re-released as the lead single from their next album, Jonas Brothers on March 13, 2007.

Music video
The music video for the Jonas Brothers' cover was directed by Andrew Bennett and produced by Justin Cronkite. It was shot back in 2006. It begins with the band entering a decorated garage, which includes posters of the band's labelmates at the time with Sony BMG. where they take their instruments: Nick and Kevin pick guitars, and Joe first plays the keyboard, then uses a microphone. As they play the intro, Nick comes home on a bike. He starts singing while the video's story side views him noticing a flash of light next door. He goes over there, and is joined by Joe and Kevin. Their neighbour "Peter" shows them that he made a time machine. However, this one is different from the one in Busted's video. This one is Pete's sofa rather than the car. While they continue to play the song, they enter the time machine, and when in the year 3000 they are in an all-white room. There they see girls with round, pink hair instead of three triple-breasted girls in Busted's. At the bridge, the girls show the band their 7th album, and the album by Kelly Clarkson that their album outsold rather than Michael Jackson. Later, one of the girls shows Joe the city on the outside, while another shows Kevin the band's "great-great-great granddaughters". Towards the end of the song, the brothers jump into the time machine and return to their own time. At the end of the song, Nick sings, while Joe claps the rhythm and Kevin plays the ending riff on his guitar. It premiered on Disney Channel in January 2007.

Response from Busted
In November 2016, in an interview with PopBuzz, Busted were asked what they thought of the Jonas Brothers' cover of the song. Matt Willis responded: "Dude, they paid my mortgage for four years, I'm stoked to bits. Thank you very much Jonas Brothers," whilst James Bourne said, "The thing about it is that...when I heard their version of it, I didn't really like it. But there has been some really good things that have happened as a result of it. I didn't like how they changed words around. But the thing is, what's mental is that "Year 3000" was synced in The Simpsons [episode "Mathlete's Feat"] recently...But the thing is, when I asked them to do that, they already had chosen to use the original version. And the thing is I don't think they'd have been aware of the song if that hadn't have happened. So we ended up getting our version on The Simpsons which was cool. If someone had said to me all those years ago 'if you let them do it you'll get your song on The Simpsons I would have done it immediately." In 2019 at the Capital’s Summertime Ball 2019, Busted and Jonas Brothers performed the song together live.

Charts

References

2002 songs
2003 singles
2006 singles
Busted (band) songs
Jonas Brothers songs
Hollywood Records singles
PolyGram singles
Songs written by James Bourne
Songs written by Tom Fletcher
Songs written by Danny Jones
Songs written by Steve Robson
Songs written by Charlie Simpson
Songs written by Matt Willis
Song recordings produced by Steve Robson
Fiction set in the 30th century
Songs about time travel